Rosita is a Muppet character on the children's television series Sesame Street. Fluent in both American English and Mexican Spanish, she is the first regular bilingual Muppet on the show. Rosita comes from Mexico and likes to play the guitar.

History

Rosita was originally designed to look similar to a fruit bat and bore the name Rosita, La Monstrua de las Cuevas ("the monster of the caves"). Her wings were removed in 2004 (in the show's 35th season), but reinstated in 2021 (in the show’s 52nd season).  She wears a ribbon in her hair, but in deference to Zoe she only wears one instead of two.

Rosita was introduced to the series in 1991.

Rosita is performed by Carmen Osbahr, who originally worked on Mexico's Plaza Sésamo.

In July 2022, Sesame Place in Pennsylvania faced criticism after a family claimed in an Instagram post that the character snubbed their two young Black children by ignoring them as they waved to her. The video went viral as other users posted similar incidents of costumed characters and black children at the park, with those on social media calling for a boycott of the park. The park released a statement that the costume had made it difficult for the performer to see the girls. They later followed with another statement that the performer had not intentionally snubbed the girls, but instead rejected a request "from someone in the crowd who asked Rosita to hold their child for a photo which is not permitted." On July 19, Sesame Place Pennsylvania formally apologized to the family and invited the family back for a personal meet-and-greet with the characters. They also announced that their employees will undergo racial bias training to ensure park guests have an "inclusive, equitable and entertaining" experience.

International programs

Rosita appeared on Barrio Sésamo: Monstruos Supersanos in July and August 2012.

Appearances

March 3, 2004: Rosita, Elmo, Zoe, Big Bird and purple AM Monster appear on The West Wing.

April 24, 2004: Rosita, Elmo, Zoe, Grover, Cookie Monster Phoebe and Elephant on Hollywood Hits Broadway Benefit Gala

November 4, 2005: Elmo, Grover, Telly, Rosita and a Muppet Turkey on Emeril Live.

May 3, 2008: Rosita on The Early Show

May 4, 2008: Rosita on Good Morning America

May 15, 2008: Rosita on Tell Me More

July 4, 2009: Elmo, Big Bird, Cookie Monster, Oscar the Grouch, Rosita, and Abby Cadabby on A Capitol Fourth

November 9, 2009: Elmo and Rosita on Late Night with Jimmy Fallon

December 3, 2009: Elmo, Rosita and Cookie Monster on The Tyra Show

September 20, 2011: Elmo, Grover, Rosita, Cookie Monster, Oscar, and Slimey on Good Morning America

September 19, 2012: Elmo, Big Bird, Murray, Grover, Bert, Abby, Rosita, Oscar, and Cookie Monster on Good Morning America

January 28, 2013: Rosita, Grundgetta, Herry, Alan Muraoka, Bob McGrath, Roscoe Orman, Sonia Manzano, and Alison Bartlett O'Reilly, at From Broadway With Love: A Benefit Concert for Sandy Hook

May 10, 2013: Rosita, Oscar, Cookie Monster, Telly and Armando on Good Morning America.

September 13, 2013: Elmo, Grover, Abby Cadabby, Rosita, Cookie Monster, Murray, The Count, and Big Bird on Good Morning America

December 11–14, 2014: Elmo, Grover, Rosita, Ernie, Bert, Cookie Monster, Big Bird, The Count, Abby and guest star Santino Fontana at Mormon Tabernacle Choir

January 15, 2016: Ernie, Telly, Abby, Rosita, Elmo and Carol-Lynn Parente on Good Morning America

April 17, 2016: Elmo, Rosita, and Oscar the Grouch on Last Week Tonight with John Oliver

May 1, 2016: Elmo and Rosita at Daytime Emmy Awards

January 5, 2017: Big Bird, Elmo, Oscar the Grouch, Cookie Monster, Abby Cadabby, The Count, Rosita and Grover on Today

January 10, 2017: Abby Cadabby, Rosita and Telly at SiriusXM

October 6, 2017: Big Bird, Rosita and Abby Cadabby on Good Morning America

October 6, 2017: Elmo, Rosita and Abby Cadabby on Today

November 8, 2017: Alan Muraoka, Rosemarie Truglio, Elmo, Abby, Zoe, Big Bird, Telly, Count von Count, Rosita, Cookie Monster, Bert and Ernie on Today

July 4, 2019: Big Bird, Elmo, Abby Cadabby, Rosita, Ernie and Bert on A Capitol Fourth

October 21, 2019: Elmo, Abby, Big Bird, Cookie Monster, Rosita, Ernie, Bert, Oscar, Grover, and the Count on Today

References

External links

Fictional bats
Fictional monsters
Fictional Mexican people
Mexico in fiction
Sesame Street Muppet characters
Television characters introduced in 1991
American female characters in television